The A25 road is a motorway in Belgium.

Route description

History

Exit list

References 

25